Bilateral relations exist between the Republic of Austria and the Republic of North Macedonia. Diplomatic relations between the two countries were established on 23 December 1994. Austria maintains an embassy in Skopje, while North Macedonia maintains an embassy in Vienna.

Relations

Austria, being a member state of the European Union, supports North Macedonia's efforts to join the organization. It also supported North Macedonia during the country's visa liberalization process and the European Commission's positive decision in 2009 concerning the start of accession negotiations between the EU and North Macedonia.

See also
 Foreign relations of Austria
 Foreign relations of North Macedonia 
 Accession of North Macedonia to the European Union 
 Macedonians in Austria
 Fire of Skopje 1689
 Austria–Yugoslavia relations

References

 
North Macedonia
Bilateral relations of North Macedonia